The Arem language (Cmbrau ) is an endangered language spoken in a small area on either side of the Laos–Vietnam border. It is an Austro-Asiatic language that is a member of the Vietic language family. Specifically, it is a member of the Chut language group, which is one of the six Vietic languages. This language is considered severely endangered by UNESCO. Like other Vietic languages, the Arem language makes use of a tonal or phonational system that is unique to Vietic languages. Like many southern Vietic Languages, the Arem language also makes use of pre-syllables or sesquisyllables within the language.

Arem lacks the breathy phonation common to most Vietic languages, but does have glottalized final consonants.

History and background 
Arem is an ethnographic term to describe a group of indigenous people that reside on the border of Southern Vietnam and Laos. The people prefer to call themselves Cmbrau . However, because this is the only attested  sesquisyllabic structure in the language, it is theorized that this may also be an ethnographic term that was borrowed from another nearby language. The Arem people were only known to exist by local populations of Vietnam until 1959, when they were discovered by the Vietnamese military. Previously, the local authorities had thought them members of the local Bru khùa community. The Arem population was only 53 people in 1960: 30 men and 23 women. The most recent survey of the area in 1999 indicated that there were 102 Arem people. Of these 102 Arem people, only around 25% of the population was estimated to be using the Arem language on a consistent basis. All speakers of the Arem language are bilingual speakers of Vietnamese and some are also fluent in Khùa and/or Lao as well.

Grammatical properties 
The Arem language makes use of both monosyllabic words and sesquisyllabic words. It is estimated that 55-60% of the Arem language's consists of sesquisyllabic words. This is much higher than the majority of other Vietic languages that typically utilize sesquisyllables in only 35-40% of their lexicon, if the particular language contains any sesquisyllables at all.

Notes and references

Notes

Bibliography
 (see note on talk page)
Ferlus, Michel. 2014. Arem, a Vietic Language. Mon-Khmer Studies 43.1:1-15 (ICAAL5 special issue).

External links
Arem corpus collected by Michel Ferlus and Trần Trí Dõi. Pangloss Collection – (CNRS, Paris).

Languages of Laos
Vietic languages
Languages of Vietnam
Endangered Austroasiatic languages